Dodecanol , or lauryl alcohol, is an organic compound produced industrially from palm kernel oil or coconut oil. It is a fatty alcohol. Sulfate esters of lauryl alcohol, especially sodium lauryl sulfate, are very widely used as surfactants. Sodium lauryl sulfate, ammonium lauryl sulfate, and sodium laureth sulfate are all used in shampoos. Lauryl alcohol is tasteless and colorless with a floral odor.

Production and use
In 1993, the European demand of dodecanol was around 60 thousand tons per year (Tt/a).  It can be obtained from palm kernel or coconut oil fatty acids and methyl esters by hydrogenation. It may also be produced synthetically via the Ziegler process. A classic laboratory method involves Bouveault-Blanc reduction of ethyl laurate.

Dodecanol is used to make surfactants, lubricating oils, pharmaceuticals, in the formation of monolithic polymers and as a flavor enhancing food additive. In cosmetics, dodecanol is used as an emollient. It is also the precursor to dodecanal, an important fragrance, and 1-bromododecane, an alkylating agent for improving the lipophilicity of organic molecules.

Toxicity 

Dodecanol can irritate the skin. It has about half the toxicity of ethanol, but it is very harmful to marine organisms.

Mutual solubility with water

The mutual solubility of 1-dodecanol and water has been quantified as follows.

References

External links 

 MSDS at Oxford
 MSDS at  J.T. Baker

Fatty alcohols
Primary alcohols
Alkanols